Abzac is the name of the following communes in France:

 Abzac, Charente, in the Charente department
 Abzac, Gironde, in the Gironde department